The Youngest Toba eruption was a supervolcano eruption that occurred around 74,000 years ago at the site of present-day Lake Toba in Sumatra, Indonesia. It is one of the Earth's largest known explosive eruptions. The Toba catastrophe theory holds that this event caused a severe global volcanic winter of six to ten years and contributed to a 1,000-year-long cooling episode, leading to a genetic bottleneck in humans.

A number of genetic studies revealed that 50,000 years ago human ancestor population greatly expanded from only a few thousand individuals. Science journalist Ann Gibbons posited that the low population size was caused by the Youngest Toba eruption. Geologist Michael R. Rampino of New York University and volcanologist Stephen Self of the University of Hawaiʻi at Mānoa supported her suggestion. In 1998, the bottleneck theory was further developed by anthropologist Stanley H. Ambrose of the University of Illinois Urbana-Champaign. However, physical evidence refutes the links with millennium-long cold event and genetic bottleneck, and some consider the theory disproven.

Supervolcanic eruption

The Youngest Toba eruption occurred at the present location of Lake Toba in Indonesia and was dated to 73,880 ± 320 years ago through high-precision potassium argon dating. This eruption was the last and largest of four eruptions of the Toba Caldera Complex during the Quaternary period, and is also recognized from its diagnostic horizon of ashfall, the Youngest Toba tuff. It had an estimated Volcanic explosivity index (VEI) of 8 (the highest rating on the scale); it made a sizable contribution to the  caldera complex. 

Computational ash dispersal models suggested possibly as much as  DRE was erupted. An even greater volume of  DRE has been suggested based on loss ash from pyroclastic flows.

The eruption was of exceptional intensity and was completed within only 9 to 14 days. A blanket of volcanic ash was also deposited over the Indian Ocean, the Arabian Sea, and the South China Sea. Glass shards from this eruption have also been discovered in East Africa.

Climatic effects 
By analyzing climate proxies and simulating climate forcing, researchers can gain insights into the immediate climatic effects of the Toba eruption. However, there are limitations to both approaches. In sedimentary records where the Toba tuff does not serve as a marker horizon, it cannot pinpoint the exact section that records the environmental conditions immediately following the eruption. Meanwhile, in sedimentary records that do have the Toba tuff as a marker horizon, the sedimentation rate may be too low to capture the short-term climatic effects of the eruption. On the other hand, results of climate models entirely depend on the volatile budget of erupted magma, hence varies accordingly to the assumed volatile budget.

Climate proxy 
Toba tephra layer in marine sediments coincides δ18O marine isotope stage 5a to 4 boundary, marking a climatic transition from warm to cold caused by change in ocean circulation and drop in atmospheric CO2 concentration, also known as Dansgaard-Oeschger event. Geologist Michael R. Rampino and volcanologist Stephen Self hypothesized that Toba eruption accelerated this shift. Testing this hypothesis required higher resolution sedimentary records.

Two marine sediment cores Toba marker horizon retrieved from the Northern Indian Ocean and the South China Sea either showed no pronounced cooling or a  cooling in the centuries following eruption. The core resolution was insufficient to ascertain that the cooling was caused by Toba eruption since the two events could be decades or centuries apart in the core. However, a severe cooling of only a few years is not expected to appear in these sediment records of centennial resolution. Nonetheless, the marine sedimentary records are support that Toba had only a minor impact on the time scales longer than a century.

In Greenland ice cores, a large sulfate spike that appeared between Dansgaard–Oeschger event 19 and 20 was possibly related to Toba eruption. The δ18O values of the ice cores indicate a 1,000-year cooling event immediately following the sulfate signal. However, high-resolution δ18O excluded the possibility of a more-than-a-century-long cooling impact of the eruption and ruled out that Toba triggered the cooling as it was already underway. 

Insufficient resolution in marine sediments bearing the Toba tuff has hindered the assessment of any short-term effects that may have lasted for less than a century.

In 2013, a microscopic layer of Toba ash was reported in sediments of Lake Malawi. Together with the high sedimentation rate of the lake and Toba marker horizon, several team have reconstructed the local environment after Toba eruption at subdecadal resolution of ~6–9 years. The sediments in core display no clear evidence of cooling and no unusual deviations in concentrations of climate-sensitive ecological indicators. These results imply that the duration of the Toba cooling must have been either shorter than the sampling resolution of ~6–9 years or too small in magnitude in East Africa.

Climate model 
The mass of sulfurous gases emitted during Toba eruption is a crucial parameter when modeling its climatic effects.

An initiation of 1,000-year cold period or ice age is not supported by the model. 

Negative temperature anomalies return to less than  within 3 and 6 years for each emission scenario after the eruption.

Petrological studies of Toba magma constrained that the mass of sulfuric acid aerosols from Toba eruption represents about 2–5 times the sulfuric acid aerosols generated during 1991 Pinatubo eruption. The studies suggest that previous modelings of global temperature perturbations following Toba eruption were excessive. Ice core records of atmospheric sulfur injection during the period which Toba eruption occurred contain three large injection that are 10–30 times the Pinatubo sulfur.

Genetic bottleneck hypothesis

Genetic bottleneck in humans

The Youngest Toba eruption has been linked to a genetic bottleneck in human evolution about 70,000 years ago; it is hypothesized that the eruption resulted in a severe reduction in the size of the total human population due to the effects of the eruption on the global climate. According to the genetic bottleneck theory, between 50,000 and 100,000 years ago, human populations sharply decreased to 3,000–10,000 surviving individuals. It is supported by some genetic evidence suggesting that today's humans are descended from a very small population of between 1,000 and 10,000 breeding pairs that existed about 70,000 years ago.

Proponents of the genetic bottleneck theory (including Robock) suggest that the Youngest Toba eruption resulted in a global ecological disaster, including destruction of vegetation along with severe drought in the tropical rainforest belt and in monsoonal regions. A 10-year volcanic winter triggered by the eruption could have largely destroyed the food sources of humans and caused a severe reduction in population sizes. These environmental changes may have generated population bottlenecks in many species, including hominids; this in turn may have accelerated differentiation from within the smaller human population. Therefore, the genetic differences among modern humans may reflect changes within the last 70,000 years, rather than gradual differentiation over hundreds of thousands of years.

Other research has cast doubt on a link between the Toba Caldera Complex and a genetic bottleneck. For example, ancient stone tools in southern India were found above and below a thick layer of ash from the Youngest Toba eruption and were very similar across these layers, suggesting that the dust clouds from the eruption did not wipe out this local population. Additional archaeological evidence from southern and northern India also suggests a lack of evidence for effects of the eruption on local populations, leading the authors of the study to conclude, "many forms of life survived the supereruption, contrary to other research which has suggested significant animal extinctions and genetic bottlenecks". However, evidence from pollen analysis has suggested prolonged deforestation in South Asia, and some researchers have suggested that the Toba eruption may have forced humans to adopt new adaptive strategies, which may have permitted them to replace Neanderthals and "other archaic human species".

Additional caveats include difficulties in estimating the global and regional climatic impacts of the eruption and lack of conclusive evidence for the eruption preceding the bottleneck. Furthermore, genetic analysis of Alu sequences across the entire human genome has shown that the effective human population size was less than 26,000 at 1.2 million years ago; possible explanations for the low population size of human ancestors may include repeated population bottlenecks or periodic replacement events from competing Homo subspecies.

Genetic bottlenecks in other mammals
Some evidence points to genetic bottlenecks in other animals in the wake of the Youngest Toba eruption. The populations of the Eastern African chimpanzee, Bornean orangutan, central Indian macaque, cheetah and tiger, all recovered from very small populations around 70,000–55,000 years ago.

Migration after Toba
The exact geographic distribution of anatomically modern human populations at the time of the eruption is not known, and surviving populations may have lived in Africa and subsequently migrated to other parts of the world.  Analyses of mitochondrial DNA have estimated that the major migration from Africa occurred 60,000–70,000 years ago, consistent with dating of the Youngest Toba eruption to around 75,000 years ago.

See also

Citations and notes

References

Further reading

External links
 Population Bottlenecks and Volcanic Winter
 
 "The proper study of mankind" – Article in The Economist
 Homepage of Professor Stanley H. Ambrose, including bibliographic information on the two papers he has published on the Toba catastrophe theory
 "Ancient 'Volcanic Winter' Tied To Rapid Genetic Divergence in Humans", ScienceDaily (Sep. 8, 1998) – Article based on news release regarding Ambrose's paper
 Mount Toba: Late Pleistocene human population bottlenecks, volcanic winter, and differentiation of modern humans by Professor Stanley H. Ambrose, Department of Anthropology, University Of Illinois, Urbana, USA; Extract from "Journal of Human Evolution" [1998] 34, 623–651
 Journey of Mankind by The Bradshaw Foundation – includes discussion on Toba eruption, DNA and human migrations
 Geography Predicts Human Genetic Diversity ScienceDaily (Mar. 17, 2005) – By analyzing the relationship between the geographic location of current human populations in relation to East Africa and the genetic variability within these populations, researchers have found new evidence for an African origin of modern humans.
 Out of Africa – Bacteria, As Well: Homo Sapiens And H. Pylori Jointly Spread Across The Globe ScienceDaily (Feb. 16, 2007) – When man made his way out of Africa some 60,000 years ago to populate the world, he was not alone: He was accompanied by the bacterium Helicobacter pylori...; illus. migration map.
 Magma 'Pancakes' May Have Fueled Toba Supervolcano
 Youtube video "Stone Age Apocalypse"

Scientific theories
Extinction events
Geology theories
Human evolution
Lake Toba
Prehistoric Indonesia
Pre-Holocene volcanism
Supervolcanoes
Ancient natural disasters
Pleistocene volcanism
Events that forced the climate
VEI-8 eruptions
Volcanic eruptions in Indonesia
Volcanic winters